The Laba (Circassian: Лабэжъ Labez̄) is a river in Krasnodar Krai and Adygea of European Russia. It is a left tributary of the Kuban, which it joins at Ust-Labinsk. It is formed by the confluence of the Bolshaya Laba and the Malaya Laba (Малая Лаба; Лабэжьый Labez̄yj). It is used for irrigation and log driving. It is also suitable for rafting.

Its main tributaries are, from source to mouth, Malaya Laba (left), Khodz (left), Chokhrak (left), Chamlyk (right), Fars (left), Ulka (left), Giaga (left) and Psenafa (left).

References

External links

Rivers of Adygea
Rivers of Krasnodar Krai